Alexandre Skirda (1942 – December 23, 2020) was a French anarchist. His mother was Ukrainian and his father was Russian. He was a historian and a translator, specializing in the Russian anarchist revolutionary movement. His writing is in French.

Works

Books in French
 Alexandre Skirda, Kronstadt 1921: prolétariat contre bolchévisme, Tête de feuille, Paris, 1971, 271 p.
 Alexandre Skirda, Les Anarchistes dans la Révolution russe, Tête de feuilles, Paris, 1973, 186 p.
 Alexandre Skirda, Autonomie individuelle et force collective: les anarchistes et l’organisation de Proudhon à nos jours, Publico, Skirda, Spartacus, 1987, 365 p.
 Alexandre Skirda, Nestor Makhno: le cosaque libertaire, 1888–1934 ; La Guerre civile en Ukraine, 1917–1921, Éd. de Paris, Paris, 1999, 491 p.
 Alexandre Skirda, Les Anarchistes russes, les soviets et la révolution de 1917, Éd. de Paris, Paris, 2000, 348 p.

Translations in English
 Nestor Makhno (author), Alexandre Skirda (editor), (translation by Paul Sharkey), The Struggle Against The State And Other Essays, AK Press, 1 January 1996, 114 p.
 Alexandre Skirda (translation by Paul Sharkey), Facing the enemy: a history of anarchist organization from Proudhon to May 1968, AK Press, 1 January 2002, 292 p.
 Alexandre Skirda (translation by Paul Sharkey), Nestor Makhno: Anarchy's Cossack: The Struggle for Free Soviets in the Ukraine, AK Press, 2004, 415 p.

See also

Anarchism
Nestor Makhno
Kronstadt rebellion
Revolutionary Insurrectionary Army of Ukraine

References

External links
Listing of Skirda's work. 

Makhnovshchina
French anarchists
Russian anarchists
Historians of anarchism
Living people
Historians of Russia
Russian translators
1942 births